The Eastern Collegiate Racquetball Conference, also known as the ECRC, is a college sports organization dedicated to hosting and managing collegiate racquetball tournaments in Northeastern United States.

The Eastern Collegiate Racquetball hosts four tournaments that make up the ECRC season and a Regional Championship.  The first three events are in the Fall semester and the final event and Regional Championship are held in the Spring semester.

The ECRC is sponsored by RacquetWorld.com (www.racquetworld.com).

List of Teams 
Berklee School of Music
Binghamton University
Boston University
Bryant University
Carnegie Mellon University
Clarkson University
Cornell University
Everest College
Fitchburg State University
Gateway Community College
Lehigh University
Nichols College
Penn State University
Providence College
Rensselaer Polytechnic Institute
Rhode Island College
Rochester Institute of Technology
Rutgers University
Springfield College
SUNY Oswego
SUNY New Paltz
Temple University
UMass Amherst
UMass Lowell
United States Coast Guard Academy
United States Military Academy
University of Connecticut
University of Maine
University of Maryland
University of Vermont
Western New England College
Worcester Polytechnic Institute

References

External links 
 Eastern Collegiate Racquetball Conference

Racquetball in the United States